What a Week to Risk it All is ninth and last part of the What a Week series by Rosie Rushton. It was published in 2006 by Piccadilly Press Ltd.

Plot summary 
Jade has a boyfriend - Flynn, whom she met when she was going to her grandma's place in Brighton. She acts like a nurse, when she is with him and she only cares about he won't get hurt. Flynn doesn't like it, because he's preparing for running-on-a-wheel-chair competition (he had an accident and he can't walk). Once, Jade and Flynn go to a party in a club, but Jez and Tamsin go there, too. Jez wants to attack Flynn with a knife, but he hit Tansy in her head with his handful. Flynn also got hurt, but not as much as Tansy. He didn't start in competition, but he plays in school theatre. He makes few steps and he is surprised, when Jade doesn't treat him like he was made of glass.

Tansy's got problems with Andy's mother. She knows that Mrs. Richards was unfaithful to Mr. Richards and she tells about everything Holly. Unfortunately, Holly repeats it when Andy is near her and he shouts at Tansy that, she cannot keep a secret. Tansy is very upset. She goes to a party, but she doesn't come in, because Andy isn't there yet. Suddenly, she sees Jez and Tamsin. She can also see that Jade and Flynn are outside the club and Jez wants to hurt Flynn. Tansy got hurt by hitting her head. She goes to the hospital and she can't see by one eye. Andy comes to visit her and he apologises her. She doesn't tell him that, everything he heard is true. Andy's brother and sister will be baptismed. Their godfather will be Gordon - a man, who is father of the babies, but Mrs. Richards doesn't tell anybody about it. Godmother of the babies will be Tansy's mother, Clarity.

Holly is going out with Ben. Her family moved out of burnt house. She has other problems - her boyfriend wants her to make love with him, but she doesn't agree. She doesn't talk to him for some days, but he explains her everything and promises to keep his hands next to him. Holly forgives him. Holly makes a scenography for a play in school theatre. She didn't get hurt, when Jez attacked Flynn.

Cleo's mother is going to be a director in school play. For Cleo it is a bit embarrassing, because her mother thinks that, if she was a great actress, everyone will want her to work. Luckily, people, who organise it know Diana Greenway and are very pleased to work with her. Cleo goes out with Ross, but she doesn't care about him. She's angry when he runs away instead of helping Tansy, who got hurt. He apologises her and she forgives. When girl are planning holidays, she doesn't include Ross in her plans, because Holly, Jade and Tansy want to go for holiday with Cleo only and without their boyfriends.

Characters 
Tansy Meadows - Clarity's daughter. She met her father, but he doesn't keep in touch with her. She's got a boyfriend - Andy Richards, who she really loves. She got hurt by Jez, but he apologised her.
Cleo Greenway - Tansy's, Jade's and Holly's friend. She has got a boyfriend - Ross. Her mother is a well-known actress.
Holly Vine - Tansy's best friend. She wears very fashionable clothes and is very pretty. She has got a boyfriend - Ben.
Jade Williams - she's an orphan, who lost her parents in a car accident. She lives with her uncle and aunt. Flynn is her boyfriend.
Clarity Meadows - Tansy's mother. She is godmother to Andy's brother and sister.
Diana Greenway - Cleo's mother. She is a well-known actress.
Roy - Cleo's stepfather.
Angela Vine - Holly's mother.
Rupert Vine - Holly's father.
Allegra - Jade's cousin. She's Scott's girlfriend.
aunt Paula - Jade's aunt and Allegra's mother.
Andy Richards - Tansy's boyfriend.
Mr. Richards - Andy's father.
Valerie Richards - Andy's mother.
Flynn Jackson - Jade's boyfriend. He was attacked by Jez, because he's black.
Jez Connor - Tamsin's boyfriend.
Tamsin - Flynn's friend. She's Jez's girlfriend.
Ben - Holly's boyfriend.
Ross - Cleo's boyfriend.

British young adult novels
2006 British novels
Novels by Rosie Rushton